Kebapche (plural: кебапчета, kebapcheta; , plural: ќебапчиња, ḱebapčinja) is a Bulgarian dish of grilled minced meat with spices. The meat is shaped into an elongated cylindrical form, similar to a hot dog. Typically, a mix of pork and beef is used, although some recipes involve only pork. The preferred spices are black pepper, cumin and salt. Kebapche is a grilled food. It is never fried or baked.

A typical addition to a kebapche meal are chips (French fries), often covered with grated sirene (fresh white cheese similar to feta); lyutenitsa is sometimes used as a dip. The expression a three kebapcheta with sides (тройка кебапчета с гарнитура, troika kebapcheta s garnitura) is particularly well-known. The preferred drink to go with a kebapche is beer. 

The word kebapche is derived from kebab, –che is a diminutive Bulgarian neutral suffix, i.e. a "little kebab". A dish similar to kebapche and often combined with it is kyufte, which is often the same in terms of meat and spices but round-shaped. It often includes onions and parsley, which kebapche does not.

It is essentially the same dish as former Yugoslav ćevapčići, but the Bulgarian kebapcheta are typically larger.

See also
Ćevapčići, a Balkan dish
Mici (Mititei), a Romanian dish

References

External links

Bulgarian cuisine
Ground meat
Kebabs
Macedonian cuisine